The 2005 Eurocup Mégane Trophy season was the inaugural season of the Renault–supported touring car category, a one-make racing series that is part of the World Series by Renault. The season began at Circuit Ricardo Tormo on 4 June and finished at the Autodromo Nazionale Monza on 23 October, after seven rounds and fifteen races. Jan Heylen won the title, having battled Renaud Derlot for the entire campaign.

Teams and drivers

Race calendar and results

Notes

Drivers' Championship

References

External links
The Eurocup Mégane Trophy website
World Series by Renault results

Eurocup Mégane Trophy seasons
Eurocup Megane Trophy